Kieran Foley (born 14 February 1958) is an Irish judoka. He competed in the men's lightweight event at the 1984 Summer Olympics.

References

1958 births
Living people
Irish male judoka
Olympic judoka of Ireland
Judoka at the 1984 Summer Olympics
Place of birth missing (living people)
20th-century Irish people